Claude Wilson Osteen (born August 9, 1939), nicknamed "Gomer" because of his resemblance to television character Gomer Pyle, is an American former professional baseball left-handed pitcher, who played in Major League Baseball (MLB) for the Cincinnati Redlegs/Reds, Washington Senators, Los Angeles Dodgers, Houston Astros, St. Louis Cardinals, and Chicago White Sox.

Career overview
The most significant portion of Osteen's career was spent with the Dodgers. Osteen never really received a season-long chance to start in Cincinnati and was traded on Sept. 16, 1961 to the Washington Senators for pitcher Dave Sisler. With the Senators, Osteen finally got a chance to start regularly in the big leagues, albeit with a consistently sub-.500 team. After posting a winning record (15–13) in 1964, he was in much demand that winter. On December 4, 1964, Osteen was traded by the Senators to the Dodgers in a 7-player deal, with five players (two of whom were Frank Howard and Pete Richert) going to the Senators. Osteen developed into one of the game's better starters in Los Angeles.

After two years with an earned run average (ERA) under 3.00 (–), Osteen was considered a top-notch starter and a workhorse. In those two years, Osteen and the Dodgers reached two straight World Series (the only two he would reach in his career). In the 1965 World Series, the Dodgers went on to beat the Minnesota Twins in 7 games, with Osteen pitching brilliantly. He had a 0.64 ERA in the Series, with a 1–1 record including a shutout, which came after teammates Don Drysdale and Sandy Koufax had lost their respective games (the first two games of the Series). In the 1966 World Series, the Dodgers were beaten by the Baltimore Orioles in four games. Osteen was charged with the loss, in a 1–0 pitcher's duel with Wally Bunker in Game 3, despite giving up only three hits in seven innings; a home run by Paul Blair accounted for the game's only run. Osteen's final postseason statistics include a 0.86 ERA with seven strikeouts in 21 innings pitched.

In , Osteen reached his first All-Star game. His season totals included a 17–17 record, a 3.22 ERA and 152 strikeouts in 288 innings pitched. He hurled 14 complete games, with five shutouts. In , Osteen was one of the game's consistent hard-luck losers; despite a very respectable 3.08 ERA, he only won 12 of 30 decisions. The 12 victories would be his fewest in a season from 1964 to 1973; the 18 losses tied him with Ray Sadecki for the major league lead. In , Osteen won 20 games for the first time and set a number of career highs, including 321 innings pitched, 183 strikeouts, 16 complete games, and 7 shutouts.

In the 1970s, Osteen was still pitching an average of 260 innings a year. In the 1970 All-Star game, Osteen pitched three shutout innings, notching the win, in a game most remembered for the play in which Pete Rose barreled into Ray Fosse to score the winning run in the 12th inning. Coincidentally, like Osteen, the pitcher and hitter involved in the walk-off single were also Tennessee natives: Jim Hickman (who had been a Dodger teammate of Osteen's in 1967) collected the hit off losing pitcher Clyde Wright (coincidentally, Hickman and Wright would become Comeback Players of the Year in their respective leagues).

In , Osteen had a particularly strong year, finishing with 7 complete game victories in his last 9 starts. That year, he was 20–11, with a 2.64 ERA, in 252 innings pitched.

Osteen made his 3rd and final All-Star team in 1973, in what would prove to be his last real quality MLB campaign — and his last season with the Dodgers. That year, while pitching for a 2nd-place Dodger team, Osteen went 16–11 and posted a 3.31 ERA, while logging 33 starts, 12 complete games, and 3 shutouts. He had achieved double-figure wins each year, for 10 consecutive seasons (1964–1973).

Osteen was dealt along with minor-league right-handed pitcher David Culpepper from the Dodgers to the Houston Astros for Jimmy Wynn at the Winter Meetings on December 6, 1973. Wynn helped the Dodgers win the 1974 NL pennant The Astros traded Osteen to the St. Louis Cardinals in August 1974. On September 11, 1974 he pitched 9 innings of relief against the New York Mets in a 25 inning game, won by St. Louis 4–3. He did not figure in the decision. In April 1975, he was released by the Cardinals and was signed by the Chicago White Sox, for whom he played his final game on September 27, 1975. His release by the White Sox on April 5, 1976 was among the team's final roster cuts at the end of spring training. Over the course of an 18-year professional career, Osteen compiled 196 wins, 1,612 strikeouts, and a 3.30 ERA.

As a batter, Osteen had a lifetime .188 batting average, with 8 home runs, and 76 runs batted in (RBI). He was used as pinch hitter on a number of occasions. Defensively, he recorded a .971 fielding percentage which was 18 points higher than the league average at his position.

He also coached various minor league teams.

Highlights

3-time All-Star (1967, 1970, 1973)
Top 10 in the league in games started, 10 times (1964, 1965, 1966, 1967, 1968, 1969, 1970, 1971, 1972, 1975)
2nd in the league in shutouts 3 times (1967, 1969, 1970); top 10 in the league 3 more times (1971, 1972, 1973)
Top 10 in the league in innings pitched, 6 times (1964, 1965, 1967, 1969, 1970, 1972)
Top 10 in ERA, 3 times (1965, 1966, 1972)
Ranks #77 in all-time innings pitched (3460)
Ranks #44 (tie) in all-time shutouts (40)
Ranks #54 in all-time games started (488)

See also

 List of St. Louis Cardinals coaches

References

External links

Claude Osteen at SABR (Baseball BioProject)
Claude Osteen at Tennessee Encyclopedia

 

   
 
   
   

1939 births
Living people
Baseball players from Tennessee
Chicago White Sox players
Cincinnati Redlegs players
Cincinnati Reds players
Houston Astros players
Indianapolis Indians players
Los Angeles Dodgers coaches
Los Angeles Dodgers players
Los Angeles Dodgers scouts
Major League Baseball pitchers
Major League Baseball pitching coaches
Nashville Vols players
National League All-Stars
People from Reading, Ohio
Philadelphia Phillies coaches
St. Louis Cardinals coaches
Seattle Rainiers players
Texas Rangers coaches
Washington Senators (1961–1971) players
Wenatchee Chiefs players